Andreas Martin (born 23 December 1952 in Berlin) is a German schlager singer. He came third in the OGAE Second Chance Contest 1989.

Discography 
 1982 Andreas Martin
 1984 Was man Liebe nennt
 1987 Du bist alles
 1988 Nur bei dir
 1990 Ein Teil von mir
 1991 Side by Side (with Drafi Deutscher as New Mixed Emotions)
 1992 Verbotene Träume
 1994 Herz oder gar nichts
 1995 Alles Gute, in Liebe
 1997 Mit dir und für immer
 1998 Allein wegen dir
 2001 C'est la vie
 2002 Das Beste
 2003 Niemals zu alt
 2005 Wir leben nur einmal
 2006 Gib niemals deine Träume auf
 2007 100 Prozent Sehnsucht
 2008 Mondsüchtig
 2009 Aufgemischt
 2010 Lichtstrahl
 2012 Kein Problem
 2012 All the Best (EMI compilation album series)
 2014 Für dich
 2016 Tänzer, Träumer, Spinner

References

External links 

 Official website 

1952 births
German male singer-songwriters
Schlager musicians
Musicians from Berlin
Living people